State Road 168 is a  east–west two-lane highway that exists entirely within Gibson County in the far southwestern portion of the state, spanning Barton, Montgomery, and Union townships.

Route description

State Road 168 runs from State Road 65 in Owensville, through the north side of Fort Branch, to State Road 57 in Mackey.

State Road 168 intersects with U.S. Route 41 and Interstate 69; the latter opened on November 15, 2012.

Major intersections

References

External links

168
Transportation in Gibson County, Indiana